Harapin (Filipino, "To Face") is the eighth studio album by The Dawn, released in 2004. and the last album to feature guitarist Atsushi Matsuura who left the band a month before the album release. and the only album to feature Bassist Mon Legaspi who left a year later and eventually returned in 2016.

Track listing

Personnel
 Jett Pangan - vocals
 JB Leonor - drums, keyboards
 Francis Reyes - guitars
 Atsushi Matsuura - guitars
 Mon Legaspi - bass guitar

Accolades

References

The Dawn (band) albums
2004 albums